The Age Discrimination Act 2004 is an Act of the Parliament of Australia that prohibits age discrimination in many areas including employment, education, accommodation and the provision of goods and services. Persons of any age can be discriminated against within the meaning of the act.

Some exemptions are provided, including for religious organisations, charitable organisations and positive discrimination.

Complaints of discrimination must first be made to the Australian Human Rights Commission (AHRC), where a conciliation process can be initiated. Filing a complaint is free. If the complaint is not resolved through the conciliation process, it can be taken to the Federal Court or the Federal Circuit Court.

In general, age discrimination is not a criminal offence. However, the Act creates criminal offences of discriminatory advertising, victimisation and failure to disclose statistical or actuarial data upon request by the President of the AHRC.

See also
 Keech v Metropolitan Health Service
 List of anti-discrimination acts

References

2004 in Australian law
Acts of the Parliament of Australia
Ageism
Anti-discrimination law in Australia
Children's rights legislation
Old age in Australia